Brighouse is a town and an unparished area in the metropolitan borough of Calderdale, West Yorkshire, England. It contains 71 listed buildings that are recorded in the National Heritage List for England.  Of these, two are listed at Grade I, the highest of the three grades, six are at Grade II*, the middle grade, and the others are at Grade II, the lowest grade.  This list contains the listed buildings in Brighouse Ward which, in addition to the town of Brighouse, contains the village of Clifton and the surrounding countryside, in particular to the west and the southeast of the town along the valley of the River Calder.  Historically, one of the most important buildings in the area was Kirklees Priory, which has been demolished, but listed buildings associated with it remain, in particular farm buildings in Home Farm and a gatehouse.  In addition to the River Calder, the Calder and Hebble Navigation runs through the area, and listed buildings associated with the two waterways include bridges, locks, lock keepers' houses, a warehouse, and a milestone.  The other listed buildings include houses and associated structures, cottages, farmhouses and farm buildings, shops and offices, churches and chapels, two graves, a sundial, a former mill, a former school, civic buildings, banks, a railway bridge, road milestones, a boundary stone, a folly, and a war memorial.


Key

Buildings

References

Citations

Sources

Lists of listed buildings in West Yorkshire
Listed